Mukesh Dhirubhai Ambani (born 19 April 1957) is an Indian billionaire businessman. He is the chairman and managing director of Reliance Industries Ltd. (RIL), a Fortune Global 500 company and India's most valuable company by market value. According to Bloomberg Billionaires Index, Ambani's net worth is estimated at $83.4 billion , making him the richest person in Asia and the 10th richest person in the world.

Early life 
Mukesh Dhirubhai Ambani was born on 19 April 1957 in the British Crown colony of Aden (present-day Yemen) into a Gujarati Hindu family to Dhirubhai Ambani and Kokilaben Ambani. He has a younger brother Anil Ambani and two sisters, Nina Bhadrashyam Kothari and Dipti Dattaraj Salgaonkar.

Ambani lived only briefly in Yemen because his father decided to move back to India in 1958 to start a trading business that focused on spices and textiles. The latter was originally named "Vimal" but later changed to "Only Vimal". His family lived in a modest two-bedroom apartment in Bhuleshwar, Mumbai until the 1970s. The family's financial status slightly improved when they moved to India but Ambani still lived in a communal society, used public transportation, and never received an allowance. Dhirubhai later purchased a 14-floor apartment block called 'Sea Wind' in Colaba, where, until recently, Ambani and his brother lived with their families on different floors.

Education 
Ambani attended the Hill Grange High School at Peddar Road, Mumbai, along with his brother and Anand Jain, who later became his close associate. After his secondary schooling, he studied at St. Xavier's College, Mumbai. He then received a BE degree in chemical engineering from the Institute of Chemical Technology.

Ambani later enrolled for an MBA at Stanford University but withdrew in 1980 to help his father build Reliance, which at the time was still a small but fast-growing enterprise. His father felt that real-life skills were harnessed through experiences and not by sitting in a classroom, so he called his son back to India from Stanford to take command of a yarn manufacturing project in his company.

Ambani has been quoted as saying that he was influenced by his teachers William F. Sharpe and Man Mohan Sharma because they are "the kind of professors who made you think out of the box."

Career 
In 1981 he started to help his father Dhirubhai Ambani run their family business, Reliance Industries Limited. By this time, it had already expanded so that it also dealt in refining and petrochemicals. The business also included products and services in the retail and telecommunications industries. Reliance Retail Ltd., another subsidiary, is also the largest retailer in India. Reliance's Jio has earned a top-five spot in the country's telecommunication services since its public launch on 5 September 2016.

As of 2016, Ambani was ranked as the 36th richest person in the world, and has consistently held the title of India's richest person on Forbes magazine's list for the past ten years. He is the only Indian businessman on Forbes' list of the world's most powerful people. As of October 2020, Mukesh Ambani was ranked by Forbes as the 6th-wealthiest person in the world. He surpassed Jack Ma, executive chairman of Alibaba Group, to become Asia's richest person with a net worth of $44.3 billion in July 2018. He is also the wealthiest person in the world outside North America and Europe. As of 2015, Ambani ranked fifth among India's philanthropists, according to China's Hurun Research Institute. He was appointed as a Director of Bank of America and became the first non-American to be on its board.

Through Reliance, he also owns the Indian Premier League franchise Mumbai Indians and is the founder of the Indian Super League, a football league in India. In 2012, Forbes named him one of the richest sports owners in the world. He resides at the Antilia, one of the world's most expensive private residences with its value reaching $1 billion.

Timeline

1980s–1990s 
In 1980, the Indian government under Indira Gandhi opened PFY (polyester filament yarn) manufacturing to the private sector. Dhirubhai Ambani applied for a license to set up a PFY manufacturing plant. Obtaining the license was a long-drawn-out process requiring a strong connection within the bureaucracy system because the government, at the time, was restricting large-scale manufacturing, making the importation of yarn for the textiles impossible. In spite of stiff competition from Tatas, Birlas and 43 others, Dhirubhai was awarded the license, more commonly addressed as License Raj. To help him build the PFY plant, Dhirubhai pulled his eldest son out of Stanford in 1981, where he was studying for his MBA, to work with him in the company. Ambani did not return to his university program, as he was in charge of Reliance's vertical integration, from textiles into polyester fibers and further into petrochemicals, which the yarns were made from. After joining the company, he reported daily to Rasikbhai Meswani, then executive director. The company was being built from scratch with the principle of everybody contributing to the business and not heavily depend on selected individuals. Dhirubhai treated him as a business partner allowing him the freedom to contribute even with little experience. This principle came into play after Rasikbhai's death in 1985 along with Dhirubhai suffering a stroke in 1986 when all the responsibility shifted to Ambani and his brother. Mukesh Ambani set up Reliance Infocomm Limited (now Reliance Communications Limited), which was focused on information and communications technology initiatives. At the age of 24, Ambani was given charge of the construction of Patalganga petrochemical plant when the company was heavily investing in oil refinery and petrochemicals.

2000s–present 
On 6 July 2002, Mukesh's father died after suffering a second stroke, which elevated tensions between the brothers as Dhirubhai had not left a will for the distribution of the empire in 2004. Their mother intervened to stop the feud, splitting the company into two, Ambani receiving control of Reliance Industries Limited and Indian Petrochemicals Corporation Limited, which was later approved by the Bombay High Court in December 2005.

Ambani directed and led the creation of the world's largest grassroots petroleum refinery at Jamnagar, India, which had the capacity to produce 660,000 barrels per day (33 million tonnes per year) in 2010, integrated with petrochemicals, power generation, port, and related infrastructure. In December 2013 Ambani announced, at the Progressive Punjab Summit in Mohali, the possibility of a "collaborative venture" with Bharti Airtel in setting up digital infrastructure for the 4G network in India. On 18 June 2014, Mukesh Ambani, while addressing the 40th AGM of Reliance Industries, said he will invest Rs 1.8 trillion (short scale) across businesses in the next three years and launch 4G broadband services in 2015.

Ambani was elected as a member into the National Academy of Engineering in 2016 for engineering and business leadership in oil refineries, petrochemical products, and related industries. In February 2016, Ambani-led Jio launched its own 4G smartphone brand named LYF. In June 2016, it was India's third-largest-selling mobile phone brand. The release of the service Reliance Jio Infocomm Limited, commonly known as Jio, in September 2016 was a success, and Reliance's shares increased. During the 40th annual general meeting of RIL, he announced bonus shares in the ratio of 1:1 which is the country's largest bonus issue in India, and announced the Jio Phone at an effective price of ₹0. As of February 2018, Bloomberg's "Robin Hood Index" estimated that Ambani's personal wealth was enough to fund the operations of the Indian federal government for 20 days.

In February 2014, a First Information Report (FIR) alleging criminal offenses was filed against Mukesh Ambani for alleged irregularities in the pricing of natural gas from the KG basin. Arvind Kejriwal, who had a short stint as Delhi's chief minister and had ordered the FIR, has accused various political parties of being silent on the gas price issue. Kejriwal has asked both Rahul Gandhi and Narendra Modi to clear their stand on the gas pricing issue. Kejriwal has alleged that the Centre allowed the price of gas to be inflated to eight dollars a unit though Mukesh Ambani's company spends only one dollar to produce a unit, which meant a loss of Rs. 540 billion to the country annually.

In August 2022, Ambani announced a $25bn plan for launching 5G mobile internet services in the next two months. High-speed internet will be launched in major cities such as New Delhi and Mumbai and then in the rest of the country by the end of 2023.

Board memberships 
 Member of Board of Governors Institute of Chemical Technology, Mumbai
 Chairman, managing director, Chairman of Finance Committee and Member of Employees Stock Compensation Committee, Reliance Industries Limited
 Former chairman, Indian Petrochemicals Corporation Limited
 Former vice-chairman, Reliance Petroleum
 Chairman of the board, Reliance Petroleum
 Chairman and Chairman of Audit Committee, Reliance Retail Limited
 Chairman, Reliance Exploration and Production DMCC
 Former Director, Member of Credit Committee and Member of Compensation & Benefits Committee, Bank of America Corporation
 President, Pandit Deendayal Petroleum University, Gandhinagar, Gujarat

Awards and honors

Stock manipulation and penalty 
For manipulating shares of Reliance Petroleum Limited (RPL), Reliance Industries was fined Rs. 950 crore (about 447 crore in retracted gains and 500 crore in interest) in 2007. In April 2006, RPL went public as a Reliance subsidiary at a price of Rs. 60 per share. The market crashed by 30% after it floated at roughly Rs. 100, and RPL was back at 60. In accordance with Securities and Exchange Board of India directive, RIL carried out an organised operation with the help of its agents in order to obtain unauthorised profits from the trading of its formerly listed unit, RPL, which was combined with the former in 2009.

Personal life 

He married Nita Ambani in 1985 and they have two sons, Akash and Anant, and a daughter, Isha, who is Akash's twin. They met after his father attended a dance performance which Nita took part in and thought of the idea of arranging a marriage between the two.

They live in Antilia, a private 27-storey building in Mumbai, which was valued at US$1 billion and was the most expensive private residence in the world at the time it was built. The building requires a staff of 600 for maintenance, and it includes three helipads, a 160-car garage, private movie theater, swimming pool, and fitness center.

In 2007, Ambani gifted his wife a $60 million Airbus A319 for her 44th birthday. The Airbus, which has a capacity of 180 passengers, has been custom-fitted to include a living room, bedroom, satellite television, WiFi, sky bar, Jacuzzi, and an office.

Ambani was titled "The World's Richest Sports Team Owner" after his purchase of the IPL cricket team Mumbai Indians for $111.9 million in 2008.

Mukesh Ambani is a strict vegetarian and teetotaler. 

During the fiscal year ending 31 March 2012, he reportedly decided to forgo nearly ₹240 million from his annual pay as chief of Reliance Industries Ltd (RIL). He elected to do this even as RIL's total remuneration packages to its top management personnel increased during that fiscal year. Mukesh Ambani holds a 50.4% stake in the company. This move kept his salary capped at ₹150 million for the fourth year in a row.

In early 2019, a court in Mumbai held his younger brother, Anil Ambani, in criminal contempt for non-payment of personally guaranteed debt Reliance Communications owed to Swedish gearmaker Ericsson. Instead of jail time, the court gave Anil a month to come up with the funds. At the end of the month, Mukesh bailed out his younger brother, paying the debt.
In 2021, he was the subject of a bomb scare when a green Mahindra Scorpio SUV packed with explosives was found near a Mumbai skyscraper housing Ambani.

See also 
 Energy in India
 Reliance Industries
 Reliance Jio

References

External links 

 Profile at Reliance Industries
 Profile at Forbes
 Profile at Bloomberg L.P.  
    
    
  

 

1957 births
Mukesh
Businesspeople from Mumbai
Foreign associates of the National Academy of Engineering
Gujarati people
Hill Grange High School alumni
Indian billionaires
Indian businesspeople in the oil industry
Indian Hindus
Indian industrialists
Indian Premier League franchise owners
Institute of Chemical Technology alumni
Living people
Reliance Industries people
Stanford Graduate School of Business alumni
University of Mumbai alumni
Victims of bomb threats
Centibillionaires